Sean Lance Berdy (born June 3, 1993) is an American actor, filmmaker and entrepreneur. He began his career as a child in the film sequel The Sandlot 2 and starred in Switched at Birth for five seasons. Berdy starred in Netflix's The Society. He is the founder of The Sign Language Agency, interpreting service company.

Life 
Berdy, a native of Boca Raton, Florida, was born deaf. He is bilingual; his first language is American Sign Language (ASL) and he speaks English. As a child, Berdy was interested in magic. He won the young magicians top award at the World Magicians Festival in Saint Petersburg. Berdy was diagnosed with bipolar disorder when he was 11 years old. His formal acting career began in 2005 with his appearance in The Sandlot 2. He subsequently had roles in The Bondage, The Deaf Family, and The Legend of the Mountain Man. Berdy was featured in several public service commercials.

Berdy relocated to California in 2011 for his role in Switched at Birth in which, he starred as Emmett Bledsoe, son of Melody Bledsoe, played by Marlee Matlin. He was nominated for the 2011 Teen Choice Awards under the TV category for breakout star. He completed high school remotely while filming. Berdy provided the on-camera ASL dubbing of Ice Age: Continental Drift. In 2019, he starred as Sam Eliot, in the Netflix show The Society.

In May 2019, Berdy reported that he was writing a movie about a love story featuring ASL.

Filmography

References

External links
 

1993 births
Male actors from Florida
American male child actors
American male film actors
American male deaf actors
American male television actors
Living people
21st-century American male actors
People with bipolar disorder
21st-century American male writers
Writers from Florida
People from Boca Raton, Florida